Santa Croce is a Renaissance-style, Roman Catholic church in the center of Sinalunga, province of Siena, region of Tuscany, Italy. It is now part of the Diocese of Montepulciano-Chiusi-Pienza.

The church stands adjacent to, but predates, the Collegiata di San Martino. The façade dates to the a Mannerist architect of the 16th century. The façade has an empty frame above the central portal and other awkward elements. The church has lost many of the artworks, but still retains an altarpiece by the school of Luca Signorelli, depicting the Marriage of the Virgin.

References

16th-century Roman Catholic church buildings in Italy
Renaissance architecture in Tuscany
Churches in Sinalunga